Gilberto Martínez (4 February 1897 – 2 June 1974) was a Mexican sports shooter. He competed in the 300 m rifle event at the 1948 Summer Olympics.

References

1897 births
1974 deaths
Mexican male sport shooters
Olympic shooters of Mexico
Shooters at the 1948 Summer Olympics
Sportspeople from Saltillo